Ministry of Local Government may refer to:

Ministry of Local Government (Uganda)
Ministry of Local Government (Zambia)
Ministry of Local Governments (Turkey)